The northern Russian dialects make up one of the main groups of the Russian dialects.

Territory 
 The territory of the primary formation (e.g. that consist of "Old" Russia of the 16th century before Eastern conquests by Ivan IV) is fully or partially modern regions (oblasts): Vologda, Kostroma, Yaroslavl, Novgorod, Leningrad, Nizhny Novgorod, Arkhangelsk.
 The territory of the second formation (e.g. where Russians settled after the 16th century) consist of most of the land to the North and North-East of Central Russia, that is Karelia, Murmansk, Vyatka, Perm, Komi, Udmurtia, and as well as Siberia and Far East.

List of sub-dialects 
 Pomor dialects
 Olonets group
 Novgorod group
 Siberian dialects
 Vologda-Kirov group
 Vladimir-Volga group

Phonology 
Unstressed ,  and  after soft consonants also do not typically merge.
 In the Vologda region, final hard  is replaced by a semivowel .
Nevertheless, in some sub-dialects ,  can also be replaced with semivowel  like in Southern Russian.
Some (Shakhmatov, Durnovo) see this as an indication of possible West Slavic admixture in those areas, while others (Trubetzkoy, Lehr-Spławiński) treat it as an archaism from Proto-Slavic times.

Morphology 
 A suffixed definite article -to, -ta, -te similarly existing in Bulgarian and Macedonian.
 3rd person verbal ending with non-palatalized -t as in Standard Russian.

Vocabulary
Northern dialects are characterized by a number of words like,  ('log hut'),  ('winter crop'),  ('to bark'),  ('to plough'),  ('rye'),  ('gathering'),  ('very much'),  ('beautiful') and others. They also have about 200 words of Uralic origin.

Notes

References

External links
 Michael Daniel, Nina Dobrushina, Ruprecht von Waldenfels. The language of the Ustja river basin. A corpus of North Russian dialectal speech. 2013–2018. Bern, Moscow.

See also
 Central Russian dialects
 Southern Russian dialects
 Old Novgorod dialect
 Boris Shergin – a writer of the Pomor dialect
 Vowel reduction in Russian

Russian dialects